Felipe Rodríguez may refer to:

 Felipe Rodríguez (composer) (1859/60–1814/15), Spanish classical era composer
 Felipe Rodríguez (singer) (1926–1999), Puerto Rico singer of boleros
 Felipe Rodriguez (soccer, born 1975), retired American soccer midfielder
 Felipe Rodríguez (footballer, born 1990), Uruguayan football midfielder